Whoops Apocalypse is a 1986 British comedy film directed by Tom Bussmann and starring Loretta Swit, Herbert Lom, and Peter Cook. The film shares the same title as the TV series Whoops Apocalypse, but uses an almost completely different plot from the series.

Plot 
The beginning of the film parodies the Falklands War when a small British colony is invaded by its neighbour, the fictional country of Maguadora, whose dictator General Mosquera is played by Herbert Lom. The new president of the United States, Barbara Adams, tries to sort out the mess, but the peace talks are sabotaged by Lacrobat (Michael Richards), the world's leading terrorist. The British, under the leadership of PM Sir Mortimer Chris, send in a task force to seize the islands back. For revenge, Mosquera hires Lacrobat to kidnap the British Princess Wendy, to hold her ransom to get the British out. Sir Mortimer then threatens that unless she is returned within 48 hours, he will launch a nuclear strike. Now President Adams not only has to deal with Mosquera and Lacrobat, but also Sir Mortimer, and also with the fact that Mosquera aligns himself with Russia, and this whole thing could start World War III.

Loretta Swit is Barbara Adams, the first female U.S.  president. She was only sworn into office when the previous president, a former circus clown (parodying Ronald Reagan's entertainment career), died after asking a journalist to hit him in the stomach with a crowbar as a test of physical strength (a take on the death of Harry Houdini). To satirise the situation further, Swit plays the role straight. Adams, while trying to maintain the peace, is shown to be incompetent, especially when dealing with questions from the press. Her husband runs a weapons company which hired Lacrobat to start the war in the first place.

The film also features Peter Cook playing Sir Mortimer, an insane conservative British prime minister (an insane PM being one of the few similarities between the film and the series), who claims that unemployment is caused by evil invisible pixies. Later, he hands out Union Flag umbrellas to Conservative voters to protect them from nuclear bombs, and plans to reduce unemployment by pushing employed people off cliffs, creating new jobs. Despite the fact he is clearly insane, the public adore him and follow him blindly.  The rest of his party attempt to assassinate him, but he only loses his hand, getting a hook instead. He then takes up a new policy of crucifying disloyal party members in Wembley Stadium.

Princess Wendy is a parody of Princess Diana, who was at the height of her popularity when the film was made. When kidnapped by Lacrobat, Wendy is placed in increasingly odd disguises, including bondage gear and a King Kong outfit. Rik Mayall is featured playing the commanding officer of an inept SAS squad, most of whom are massacred in a shootout in a wax museum when attempting to rescue Wendy, who has been disguised as an exhibit. (Mayall had a small role in the original as Biff, a guitar player.) Michael Richards plays Lacrobat, the only character from the original series to appear. Lacrobat is partly responsible for the outbreak of war between the two countries, and is seemingly the only intelligent character in the film; he dies when a tiger, which the SAS keep for no reason, rips his throat out. Alexei Sayle, who also appeared in the original series, has a different role in the movie as a Soviet soldier who is hiding nuclear weapons on a Caribbean holiday island.

Other characters include two tabloid journalists who discover the Communist weapons, but are killed; a rear admiral who is openly homosexual (appropriately enough, since "rear admiral" is also apparently slang for a man who practises anal sex), two security guards who accompany President Adams everywhere (even when she is going swimming), and a former president (a parody of Richard Nixon), who is now in prison and authored the book Commie Bastards I Have Known.

Although Wendy is rescued, Sir Mortimer ignores Adams's pleas to call off the nuclear strike. She then calls the rear admiral, whom Lacrobat hypnotised to believe he was in a burning building when fingers are snapped. He ponders calling off the strike, but when a sailor snaps his fingers, he calls "Fire!", the strike is launched, and the film ends.

The film reuses jokes from the series, such as Lacrobat's absurd disguises (at one time going by the name Dr. Thesius Lyndon Penis), a dying Soviet leader, a crucifixion sight gag, the president being unable to decipher other people's technobabble, an insane prime minister, and an absurdly macho CIA agent with ludicrously complicated plans. An SAS sequence is also in the series, and another gay military character. The following mock news story was also used in both: "A woman who secured a lock of Frank Sinatra's hair twenty years ago today sold it back to him for an undisclosed sum."

Cast 
In Credits order:

See also 
The Mouse that Roared
Dr. Strangelove
Canadian Bacon
Wag the Dog
List of films based on British sitcoms
List of fictional prime ministers of the United Kingdom

External links 

1986 films
Apocalyptic films
British comedy films
British satirical films
Films based on television series
ITC Entertainment films
Metro-Goldwyn-Mayer films
1980s English-language films
1980s British films